The 1983 John Player League was the fifteenth competing of what was generally known as the Sunday League.  The competition was won for the first time by Yorkshire County Cricket Club.

Standings

Batting averages

Bowling averages

See also
Sunday League

References

John Player
Pro40